Saint-Maurice is a parish municipality in the Mauricie region of the province of Quebec in Canada.

History
The hagiotoponym refers to Saint Maurice.

The territory of Saint-Maurice was colonized in the early 1830s when the place was still part of the Seigneurie of Saint-Maurice. The Catholic parish was founded in 1837 and detached from the Parish of Cap-de-la-Madeleine. The territory of the original parish was much larger than that which exists today, as it also included the Saint-Louis-de-France neighborhood in Trois-Rivières and a part of the current parish of Notre-Dame-du-Mont-Carmel.

The parish municipality of Saint-Maurice was officially incorporated in 1855 during the original municipal division of Quebec. In 1858, the village of Fermont splitted from Saint-Maurice but was ultimately re-annexed in 1939 following the closure of the Radnor forges, the only company that supported it, and by the same token the exodus of its entire population.

In 1859, another large part of the municipality was taken away for the creation of the municipality of Notre-Dame-du-Mont-Carmel witch also included parts of the municipality of Cap-de-la-Magdeleine (today part of Trois-Rivières).

In 1904, following repeated requests from citizens living in the west of Saint-Maurice who were too far from the village and the church, a new city, Saint-Louis, was created and detached from the territory of Saint- Maurice. Saint-Louis will be renamed Saint-Louis-de-France in 1969 and will finally be annexed to Trois-Rivières in 2002. Before 1904, Saint-Maurice was therefore bounded to the west by the Saint-Maurice River and it is this natural boundary that gave its name to the territory.

Originally part of the county of Champlain, Saint-Maurice was incorporated into the regional county municipality of Francheville in 1982. In 2002, during the municipal reorganization of the region, it was included in the regional county municipality of Les Chenaux .

The church of Saint-Maurice has one of Casavant Frères' oldest organs, the opus 50, built in 1894 and still in use. With mechanical action, it has 2 keyboards and a pedal for around twenty games.

Demographics 

Population trend:
 Population in 2016: 3286 (2011 to 2016 population change: 18.4%)
 Population in 2011: 2775 (2006 to 2011 population change: 17.2%)
 Population in 2006: 2338
 Population in 2001: 2292
 Population in 1996: 2295
 Population in 1991: 2195

Mother tongue:
 English as first language: 1.1%
 French as first language: 97.4%
 English and French as first language: 0.2%
 Other as first language: 0.9%

Education
The Central Quebec School Board operates anglophone public schools, including:
 Mauricie English Elementary School in Trois-Rivières
 Three Rivers Academy in Trois-Rivières

References

Parish municipalities in Quebec
Incorporated places in Mauricie
Les Chenaux Regional County Municipality
Canada geography articles needing translation from French Wikipedia